The Division of Darling Downs was an Australian electoral division in the state of Queensland. The division was proclaimed in 1900, and was one of the original 65 divisions to be contested at the first federal election. It was named after the Darling Downs region of Queensland, and consisted mainly of the city of Toowoomba and surrounding rural areas. The seat was safely conservative for its entire existence, almost always held by the Country Party (now called the National Party), or the Liberal Party and its predecessors. Its prominent members included Sir Littleton Groom, Cabinet minister and Speaker, and Arthur Fadden, Prime Minister of Australia in 1941.

The electorate's first member, William Henry Groom, died at the first Commonwealth Parliament meeting in Melbourne in 1901. His death led to Australia's first by-election, which was won by his son Littleton. The seat was abolished in 1984, being replaced by the Division of Groom, named after the aforesaid Littleton Groom.

Members

Election results

1901 establishments in Australia
Constituencies established in 1901
Darling Downs
Darling Downs
Darling Downs